Theodora Children's Charity is a British charity which helps sick and disabled children across the UK. It was founded in 1994 and the charity focuses on improving the lives of children in hospitals and hospices through music and entertainment.

Activities
The hospitals involved in the programme receive weekly visits from "Giggle Doctors". The Giggle Doctors use their skills to involve each patient as much as possible, ensuring that the child is not only a spectator but can participate in the magic and the activities.

Awards
 Guardian Charity Awards 2003

References

External links 
 Organization website

Children's charities based in the United Kingdom
Health charities in the United Kingdom